The Moscow Metropolis electoral district was a constituency created for the 1917 Russian Constituent Assembly election. The electoral district covered the city of Moscow. Voter turnout in the city was estimated at between 65.4% and 69.7%.

The Democratic Socialist Bloc list was headed by Georgi Plekhanov.

Results

References

Electoral districts of the Russian Constituent Assembly election, 1917
1910s in Moscow